Chitrakoot Division is an administrative division of Uttar Pradesh state in northern India. Historically part of Bundelkhand region, it includes the districts of:
 Banda, 
 Chitrakoot, 
 Hamirpur, and 
 Mahoba.

Until a few years ago, this was the part of Jhansi division, but due to administrative requirements, this division was established. Chitrakoot division is one of the most backward areas of the country, which cons. full of natural raw material like moram, ballast, granite etc.

Three major rivers are part of this division: 
 Ken, 
 Betwa and 
 Yamuna.

References

Bundelkhand
Divisions of Uttar Pradesh
Chitrakoot division